Gary Wozniak (born November 27, 1987) is an American skeleton racer who won the gold medal at the 2012 Empire State Games in Lake Placid, New York.

References

External links
 

1987 births
Living people
American male skeleton racers